Yuliy Firtsak (22 August 1836 – 1 June 1912) was a Ruthenian Greek Catholic hierarch. He was bishop of the Ruthenian Catholic Eparchy of Mukacheve from 1891 to 1912.

Life 
Born in Khudlyovo, Austrian Empire (present day – Ukraine) in 1836, he was ordained a priest on 26 September 1861. He was appointed the Bishop by the Holy See on 17 December 1891. He was consecrated to the Episcopate on 10 April 1892. The principal consecrator was Bishop Ján Vályi, and the principal co-consecrators were Bishop Mihail Pavel and Bishop Gyula Meszlényi.

He died in Uzhhorod on 1 June 1912.

References 

1836 births
1912 deaths
19th-century Eastern Catholic bishops
20th-century Eastern Catholic bishops
Ruthenian Catholic bishops
People from Zakarpattia Oblast